The 1930 North Norfolk by-election was held on 9 July 1930.  The by-election was held due to the elevation to the peerage of the incumbent Labour MP, Noel Buxton. It was held for the Labour Party by his wife, Lucy Noel-Buxton.

Background
Noel Buxton had been Liberal Party for the seat until he was very narrowly defeated in 1918. After switching to Labour he regained it in 1922. At the last general election, he held the seat with a majority of 1,883 votes over the second place Conservative. During his time as MP  Noel Buxton served as Minister of Agriculture in the First MacDonald ministry in 1924, and was reappointed to that position at the start of the Second MacDonald ministry.

Result

Unlike the previous two general elections, there was no Liberal candidate in this by-election, resulting in a contest that was a straight fight between Labour and the Conservatives. Lady Noel-Buxton's narrow victory would prove to be relatively short-lived. Cook challenged her again in the next year's general election,  and this time easily defeated her, winning a majority of just under 7,000 votes.  The two would face off again in 1935, and Cook would again emerge the victor, albeit with a smaller majority.

References

1930 elections in the United Kingdom
1930 in England
20th century in Norfolk
July 1930 events
North, 1930